Fatuyeh (also Romanized as Fatūyeh and Fatooyeh) is a village in Fatuyeh Rural District, in the Central District of Bastak County, Hormozgan Province, Iran. At the 2006 census, its population was 2,565, in 545 families.

References 

Populated places in Bastak County